Sharlene Heywood (born 22 February 1963 in Carlton, Victoria) is an Australian former cricket player. Heywood played for the Victorian state women's cricket team between 1985 and 1991, and played fourteen One Day Internationals for the Australia national women's cricket team.

References

External links
 Sharlene Heywood at southernstars.org.au
 Sharlene Heywood at CricketArchive

Living people
1963 births
Australia women One Day International cricketers
Victoria women cricketers
People from Carlton, Victoria
Cricketers from Melbourne